Katie Farris (born August 10, 1983) is an American poet, fiction writer, translator, academic and editor.

Life and career

Katie Farris's work appears in The Nation, McSweeneys, Granta, The Believer, Poetry, Poetry London, American Poetry Review, Paris Review. She is the author of  BOYSGIRLS (Tupelo Press) which has been lauded as “truly innovative” (Prague Post ), “a tour de force” (Robert Coover ), and “a book with gigantic scope. At some points it reads like the book of Genesis; at others, like a dream-turned-nightmare. From the opening lines the author grabs you by the throat.” (Louisville Courier-Journal ). She has also published several chapbooks, including A NET TO CATCH MY BODY IN ITS WEAVING, which won 2021 Chad Walsh Chapbook Prize given annually by Beloit Poetry Journal. 

Farris is also the co-translator of several books including Gossip and Metaphysics: Russian Modernist Poems and Prose (Tupelo). Her work and translations had been published in The Atlantic Monthly and  featured in platforms such as MoMA, praised in The New Yorker, and included into anthologies from Penguin, Graywolf, and Harper Collins.

She is the recipient of Pushcart Prize, Anne Halley Poetry Prize from The Massachusetts Review, Flash Fairy Tale Prize from the Fairy Tale Review, and Orison Award in Fiction  (judged by Justin Torres).

Berlin-based press Five Hundred Places published her Thirteen Intimacies. Several of her books have been published in Russian and Ukrainian. Next year, Valparaiso Ediciones  in Mexico City will publish a Spanish language edition of Farris’ work, niñosniñas, translated by the acclaimed Mexican writer Pura López Colomé.

Her translation books include Polina Barskova's This Lamentable City (Tupelo Press), Guy Jean's If I Were Born in Prague (Argos Books) and Mourning Ploughs the Winter (Marick Press), as well as forthcoming A Country Where Everyone Name is Fear by Boris and Ludmila Khersonsky (Lost Horse Press). Farris won the DJS Translation Award from Poetry East/West for her co-translations in New Cathay: Contemporary Chinese Poetry, 1990-2012 (Tupelo Press )

In 2019–2020, Farris held Irving Bacheller Chair in Creative Writing at Rollins College. She has also taught at UC Berkeley and Brown University and for many years in the MFA Program at San Diego State University where she won an Innovation in Teaching Award. She has also served as the core faculty member at  New England College's Low Residency MFA Program, where she co-founded graduate program in fiction. She is currently the Associate Professor of Creative Writing at Georgia Institute of Technology.

Published works 

Books and Chapbooks

 "Standing in the Forest of Being Alive" (Alice James Books, 2023), author
 "A NET TO CATCH MY BODY IN ITS WEAVING" (Winner of the Chad Walsh Chapbook Prize, Beloit Poetry Journal, 2021), author 
 "BOYSGIRLS" (Tupelo Press, 2018, earlier edition was published by Marick Press), author 

Translations

 The Country Where Everyone's Name is Fear: Poems of Boris and Ludmila Khersonsky (Lost Horse Press, Idaho, 2022), co-editor and co-translator
 If I Were Born In Prague: Poems of Guy Jean (Argos Books, New Hampshire, 2011), co-translator
 This Lamentable City: Poems of Polina Baskova (Tupelo Press, Vermont 2010), co-translator 
 Traveling Musicians: Selected Poems of Polina Barskova (Yunost Publishers, Moscow, 2006), co-translator

Editor

 "Gossip and Metaphysics: Russian Modernist Poetry and Prose" (Tupelo Press, 2015), co-editor and co-translator

Critical reception
In Paris Review, Maureen N. McLane writes: "extraordinary poems by Katie Farris—riddling, devastating, peculiarly spritely poems about death, cancer, Emily Dickinson, the limits of mind and body:

    Will you be
    my death, breast?
    I had asked you
    in jest and in response
    you hardened—a test
    of my resolve? Malignant
    magnificent palimpsest.

    Will you be
    my death, Emily?
    Today I placed
    your collected poems
    over my breast, my heart
    knocking fast
    on your front cover.

These (from “Emiloma: A Riddle & An Answer”) and other poems are in Farris’s 2021 chapbook, A Net to Catch My Body in its Weaving (Beloit Poetry Journal); her first full-length collection, Standing in the Forest of Being Alive, is due out from Alice James in 2023. The heart knocks fast with and for this poet, the top of one’s head blown off, as Emily Dickinson almost said."

In The Los Angeles Review of Books, Olga Livshin writes: "Katie Farris’s latest chapbook, A Net to Catch My Body in Its Weaving, traces her journey with breast cancer, revolving around “the body, bald, cancerous.” In the first poem, Farris states her intention to “find, in the midst of hell / what isn’t hell,” and what she does find is both insightful and heartening. In the darkness of cancer, she discovers light — and the journey to find light, the speaker’s efforts, are just as extraordinary as the light itself."

In The Literary Review, Juliana Converse says: "Rather than the sort of tales in which we can point to a specific moral lesson, the stories in boysgirls offer more possibilities than conclusions. And while we sometimes leave these beings on the cusp of metamorphosis, Farris’ word selection and lines like incantations reverberate throughout memory and dream. Fans of Matthea Harvey's hybrid mermaids will embrace these characters, and readers of Angela Carter will bask in these mythic inventions/inversions that point to gender identity and sexual agency. With its immersive magic and unforgettable imagery, life surges through this tiny, gorgeous book that rewards and re-rewards with each tumble down its rabbit hole."

In American Book Review, Mary McMyne says: "Farris's language is delicious, maddening and mythic, dreamlike, sarcastic, witty...tales come alive as myths, as dreams."

In Bookslut, Micah McCrary says: "Farris has crafted, molded, sculpted stories that will enter our consciousness as effortlessly as tales of Mother Goose and the Brothers Grimm, because we already know them. And if Barthes had believed that myth "has the pretension of transcending itself into a factual system," Farris's stories have come with no pretense. They are humble. Fluid. Introductory in a manner that professes only innocence—and with this innocence comes belief. And belief, we know, is all that's required for myth, modern or not, to grab us tightly and carry us up into the sun."

In Poetry Flash, Robert Lipton writes: "BOYSGIRLS by Katie Farris, a collection of modern myths or extended prose poems, asks questions about the minutiae of enchantment and its attendant quotidian; the small grows large, the strong, lame and the defenestrated literally take wing. She has constructed a chimerical work, more poetry than prose, a disordered mythology, a book of secrets almost told."

In Hayden's Ferry, Debrah Lechner states: "BOYSGIRLS is a dizzying series of colorful gem-like stories, demon-and-fairy tales that present fabulous monsters that we’ve known existed all along. In fact, any of us might be one."

Interviews 
 Interview with Katie Farris in Kenyon Review
 Interview with Katie Farris in Massachusetts Review
 Interview with Katie Farris in Women's Quarterly Conversation
 Interview with Katie Farris in California Journal of Poetics

Selected Poems, Prose and Translations Online 

 "In the Event of my Death" by Katie Farris in  The Nation
 "What Would Root" by Katie Farris in Poetry
 "Standing in the Forest of Being Alive" by Katie Farris in The American Poetry Review
 "When you Walk Over the Earth" by Katie Farris in Ecotone Magazine
 "Wild Honey Is a Smell of Freedom" by Anna Akhmatova, co-translated by Katie Farris in Indiana Review 
 "They Printed in the Medical History" by Boris Khersonsky, co-translated by Katie Farris in The Atlantic Monthly
 "The Devil's Face" by Katie Farris in Annalemma Magazine

References

External links 
 Marick Press
 Tupelo Press | A nonprofit small press fostering the literary arts since 1999
 Katie Farris' Faculty Page at Georgia Tech
 Katie Farris' website

1983 births
Brown University alumni
University of California, Berkeley alumni
Writers from California
Writers from New Hampshire
Living people
New England College faculty